Prentiss Mellen (October 11, 1764December 31, 1840) was a lawyer, politician, and jurist from Massachusetts and Maine.  Born in Massachusetts and educated at Harvard, Mellen served for two years as a United States Senator from Massachusetts, and was appointed Maine's first chief justice after it achieved statehood in 1820.

Early years
Prentiss Mellen was the eighth of nine children of Rev. John Mellen and Rebecca (Prentiss) Mellen, born in 1764 in the second parish of Lancaster, Massachusetts, now Sterling.  Mellen's father was the local minister, and his mother the daughter of the first parish minister.  He graduated from Harvard College in 1784.  He moved to Barnstable, where he worked as a tutor for the family of James Otis Jr., and studied law with Shearjashub Bourne. He was admitted to the bar in 1788, and established a practice in Sterling. This was unsuccessful, and he next opened a practice in Bridgewater. There he met Sally Hudson of Hartford, Connecticut, whom he married in 1795. The couple had six children, four of whom survived him.

Still not meeting with financial success, he briefly joined his brother's law practice in Dover, New Hampshire before finally settling in Biddeford in the Massachusetts District of Maine. He moved to Portland around 1806.

Senate and Chief Justice
Mellen served on the Massachusetts Governor's Council 1808–1809, 1817, and as a presidential elector in 1817. He was a trustee of Bowdoin College in Brunswick, Maine from 1817 to 1836. He was elected to the United States Senate, representing Massachusetts, to fill the vacancy caused by the resignation of Eli P. Ashmun, and served from June 5, 1818, to May 15, 1820, when he resigned. Maine had won admission to the Union as a separate state in 1820, and he was appointed the first chief justice of the Maine Supreme Judicial Court. He served until his resignation in 1834, when age disqualified him. His last major act of public serve  was as chairman of a commission to revise and codify the public statutes of Maine, work which was completed in 1840.

In 1833, Mellen was the first President of a newly formed abolitionist society formed in Portland. Samuel Fessenden and Methodist Rev. Gershom A. Cox were the vice-presidents.

Mellen died in Portland on December 31, 1840, and was buried in its Western Cemetery.

Notes

References
Dictionary of American Biography; Greenleaf, Simon. "Memoir of the Life and Character of the Late Chief Justice Mellen." Maine Reports 17 (1841): 467–76.
Obituary in The American Quarterly

External links

Politicians from Portland, Maine
People from Sterling, Massachusetts
United States senators from Massachusetts
Massachusetts Federalists
Harvard College alumni
1764 births
1840 deaths
Massachusetts lawyers
Chief Justices of the Maine Supreme Judicial Court
Politicians from Biddeford, Maine
People from Dover, New Hampshire
Federalist Party United States senators
American abolitionists
Burials at Western Cemetery (Portland, Maine)
Activists from New Hampshire
19th-century American lawyers